The Art Directors Guild Hall of Fame was established by the Art Directors Guild in 2005 to recognize and honor the accomplishments and contributions of significant art directors and production designers in the film industry.

Inductees

2005
 Wilfred Buckland (1866–1946)
 Richard Day (1896–1972)
 John DeCuir (1918–1991)
 Anton Grot (1884–1974)
 Boris Leven (1908–1986)
 William Cameron Menzies (1896–1957)
 Van Nest Polglase (1898–1968)

2006
 John Box (1920–2005)
 Hans Dreier (1885–1966)
 Cedric Gibbons (1892–1960)
 Jan Scott (1915–2003)
 Alexandre Trauner (1906–1993)

2007
 Hilyard M. Brown (1910–2002)
 Henry Bumstead (1915–2006)
 Carroll Clark (1894–1968)
 Stephen Goosson (1889–1973)
 Harry Horner (1910–1994)

2008
 Edward Carfagno (1907–1996)
 Stephen B. Grimes (1927–1988)
 Dale Hennesy (1926–1981)
 James Trittipo (1928–1971)
 Lyle R. Wheeler (1905–1990)

2009
 Ted Haworth (1917–1993)
 Joseph McMillan "Mac" Johnson (1912–1990) 
 Romain Johnston (1929–1995)
 John Meehan (1902–1963)
 Harold Michelson (1920–2007)

2010
 Malcolm F. Brown (1903–1967)
 Bob Keene (1947–2003)
 Ferdinando Scarfiotti (1941–1994)

2011
 Alexander Golitzen (Golitsyn) (1908–2005)
 Albert Heschong (1919–2001)
 Eugène Lourié (1903–1991)

2012
 Robert F. Boyle (1909–2010)
 William S. Darling (1882–1964)
 Alfred Junge (1886–1964)

2013
 E. Preston Ames (1906–1983)
 Richard Macdonald (1919–1993)
 Edward S. Stephenson (1917–2011)

2014
 Robert Clatworthy (1911–1992)
 Harper Goff (1911–1993)
 J. Michael Riva (1948–2012)

2015
 John Gabriel Beckman (1898–1989)
 Charles Lisanby (1924–2013)
 Walter H. Tyler (1909–1990)

2016
 Carmen Dillon (1908–2000)
 Patricia Norris (1931–2015)
 Dorothea Holt Redmond (1910–2009)
 Dianne Wager (1937–2011)

2017
 Gene Allen (1918–2015)

2019
 Ben Carré (1883–1978)
 Anthony Masters (1919–1990)

2020
 Roland Anderson (1903–1989)
 William J. Creber (1931–2019)

See also
 Art Directors Guild

References

2005 establishments in the United States
Awards established in 2005
Halls of fame in California
Mass media museums in the United States
International Alliance of Theatrical Stage Employees
Film organizations in the United States
Theatrical organizations in the United States